Lansdowne is an elevated station on the Canada Line of Metro Vancouver's SkyTrain rapid transit system. It is located in Richmond, British Columbia, Canada.

Location

Lansdowne station is located at the intersection of Lansdowne Road and No. 3 Road. It serves Lansdowne Centre and Kwantlen Polytechnic University, as well as adjacent businesses and residences in the area. It is also the nearest station to the Richmond Olympic Oval, and an extension of Lansdowne Road was used to facilitate pedestrian travel between Lansdowne station and the oval during the 2010 Winter Olympics.

The station was originally to have been located at the intersection of No. 3 Road and Alderbridge Way, and would have been known as "Alderbridge station". The name "Lansdowne" comes from the former use of the site for a horse-racing track, named Lansdowne Park, from the 1920s until the 1960s.

Station information

Station layout

Bus routes
The following bus routes are located nearby:

 403 Three Road / Bridgeport Station
 405 Five Road / Cambie
 410 Richmond–Brighouse Station / 22nd Street Station
 416 Richmond–Brighouse Station / East Cambie
 N10 Richmond–Brighouse Station / Downtown

References

Canada Line stations
Railway stations in Canada opened in 2009
Buildings and structures in Richmond, British Columbia
2009 establishments in British Columbia